The Kavet (Kravet, Kaveat,  or កាវ៉ែត}}) are an ethnic group that live in Cambodia, mainly in Stung Treng (Siem Pang District) and Ratanakiri Province (Veun Sai District). They speak Kavet language.
There are 6,218 Kavet people in Cambodia as of 2008.

See also
 Khmer Loeu

References

Ethnic groups in Cambodia
Indigenous peoples of Southeast Asia